Christopher Ruocchio is an American space opera and fantasy writer and an assistant editor at Baen Books. He is best known for his Sun Eater series, the first of which earned him the 2019 Manly Wade Wellman Award. The second book in the series, Howling Dark, was nominated for a 2020 Dragon Award. He has co-edited four genre anthologies, and authored a Thor story for Avengers #750.

Biography
Christopher Ruocchio was born in North Carolina in the United States. He is Roman Catholic and attended Catholic schools until high school. He attended North Carolina State University where he graduated with a bachelor's degree in English rhetoric and minored in classics. He became an assistant editor at Baen Books in 2015. His first published work was "Not Made for Us", published in March 2018 in the Star Destroyers anthology he co-edited with Tony Daniel.

His first novel, Empire of Silence, was published by DAW Books in July that same year. Ruocchio won the 2019 Manly Wade Wellman Award for Empire. His second anthology, Space Pioneers (co-edited with Hank Davis), was released by Baen that year in November. It included one of his short stories, "The Parliament of Owls". The second book in his Sun Eater series, Howling Dark, was released in July 2019. It was nominated for a 2020 Dragon Award for Best Military Science Fiction or Fantasy Novel.

Ruocchio self-published a novella, The Lesser Devil, in his Sun Eater series in February 2020. The anthologies Overruled! and Cosmic Corsairs, both co-edited with Hank Davis, were released by Baen Books in 2020. The third book in the Sun Eater series, Demon in White, was released by DAW Books that same year. A Thor story he authored appeared in Avengers #750 in November 2021.

He is married and lives in Raleigh, North Carolina.

Bibliography

Sun Eater
The series, a blend of space opera and epic fantasy, is set 20,000 years into our future.

 Empire of Silence (July 2018, DAW Books)
 Howling Dark (July 2019, DAW Books)
 Demon in White (July 2020, DAW Books)
 Kingdoms of Death (March 2022, DAW Books)
 Ashes of Man (December 2022, DAW Books)

Short fiction set in this universe:

 The Lesser Devil (novella, February 2020, self-published)
 Queen amid Ashes (novella, December 2021, Baen Books, in Sword & Planet)

Short fiction
"Not Made for Us" in Star Destroyers (March 2018)
"The Parliament of Owls" in Space Pioneers (November 2018)
"The Demons of Arae" in Parallel Worlds: The Heroes Within edited by L. J. Hachmeister and R.R. Virdi (October 2019, Source 7)
"Kill the King" in The Dogs of God: Science Fiction According to Chris edited by Chris Kennedy (February 2020, Theogony Books)
"Victim of Changes" in Overruled! (April 2020)
"The Night Captain" in Cosmic Corsairs (August 2020)
"Good Intentions" in Shapers of Worlds edited by Edward Willett (September 2020, Shadowpaw Press)
Untitled Thor story in Avengers #750 (November 2021, Marvel Comics, art by Steve McNiven)

As editor
 Star Destroyers, co-edited with Tony Daniel (March 2018, Baen Books)
 Space Pioneers, co-edited with Hank Davis (November 2018, Baen Books)
 Overruled!, co-edited with Hank Davis (April 2020, Baen Books)
 Cosmic Corsairs, co-edited with Hank Davis (August 2020, Baen Books)
 Time Troopers, co-edited with Hank Davis (April 2022, Baen Books)

Reception
Ruocchio's writing in his first novel, Empire of Silence, was described as "promising and ambitious", but with "occasionally heavy-handed detail" by Locus reviewer Carolyn Cushman. Rob H. Bedford of SFFWorld described it as "remarkably page-turning", and Ruocchio's writing as "nuanced at times, magnetic to the reader's eyes", going on to state that "the narration felt earned and genuine". Bedford compared the book to Frank Herbert's Dune, The Book of the New Sun by Gene Wolfe, and The Name of the Wind by Patrick Rothfuss, stating that "[t]his just might be the most impressive SFF debut novel of 2018". The novel garnered the 2019 Manly Wade Wellman Award for Ruocchio.

Barnes & Noble included Howling Dark as one of their best science fiction and fantasy books for July 2019, describing it as "space opera at its most riveting and grandiose". Publishers Weekly described Ruocchio's writing in Demon in White as having "seamless worldbuilding, thought-provoking science, and heart-pounding battles". Stephen Hubbard of Book Reporter described the writing as "exquisite...epic-level storytelling" and "a powerful tour de force that stands head and shoulders above its two deftly crafted predecessors". The reviewer also stated that "no one is delivering better science fiction than Christopher Ruocchio".

Awards and honors
Ruocchio has been nominated for the following awards.

References

External links
 
 Christopher Ruocchio at the Internet Speculative Fiction Database

American science fiction writers
Baen Books
Catholics from North Carolina
Living people
North Carolina State University alumni
Writers from North Carolina
Year of birth unknown
Year of birth missing (living people)